Typhina  lamyi is a species of sea snail, a marine gastropod mollusk, in the family Muricidae, the murex snails or rock snails.

Distribution
This species occurs in Guadeloupe.

References

 Houart, R, Buge, B. & Zuccon, D. (2021). A taxonomic update of the Typhinae (Gastropoda: Muricidae) with a review of New Caledonia species and the description of new species from New Caledonia, the South China Sea and Western Australia. Journal of Conchology. 44(2): 103–147

External links
  Garrigues B. & Merle D. (2014). Nine new species of Muricidae Rafinesque, 1815 (Mollusca, Gastropoda) from the French Antilles. Zoosystema. 36(4): 841-864

lamyi
Gastropods described in 2014